Fly 104 is a local radio station, based in Kalamaria, Thessaloniki, Greece. The station's format included foreign dance, electronica and house music.

History
The station was originally launched in February 1991 as TOP 104 where broadcasting foreign pop and rock music, with a parallel transmission from the frequency of 89 MHz, since it began to emit Radio Makedonia and later TOP FM (now 89 Rainbow). On Tuesday 12 September 2000 changed its character and profile. Relaunched and renamed as Kanali 104 with a slight change in its repertoire (Greek and foreign/international songs) and parallel transmission of general interest and talk programs. On April 1, 2003, the station is under new ownership and also changed again its character and profile. Relaunched and renamed as Banana 104 returning to his old repertoire (foreign pop music).

In December 2007 it started cooperation with the Athens radio station Rythmos 94.9 relaunching and renaming it in the early next year as Rythmos 104 with a continuous change in the repertoire (Greek folk and pop songs) same as his new partner. For starting, there were some programs and shows (ex. Miranda Smoulioti's emission) and later confined in the transmission of Greek repertoire without any show. In November 2015 the station is under new ownership and also has returned to his old repertoire, transmitting foreign jazz, swing, electronic and dance music, while the cooperation with the Athens radio station is terminated. On Monday 25 January 2016 announced that the station renamed as FLY 104 and its premiere took place on the 1st of February.

External links
Fly 104
Fly104.gr

Radio stations in Greece
Mass media in Thessaloniki